The 21st Separate Mechanized Brigade is a brigade of the Ukrainian Ground Forces formed in 2023.

History 
As of the end of January 2023, the brigade is in the stage of formation.

Structure 
As of 2023 the brigade's structure is as follows:

 115th Separate Mechanized Brigade,
 Headquarters & Headquarters Company
 1st Mechanized Battalion
 2nd Mechanized Battalion
 3rd Mechanized Battalion
 Tank Battalion
 Artillery Group
 Anti-Aircraft Defense Battalion
 Reconnaissance Company
 Engineer Battalion
 Logistic Battalion
 Maintenance Battalion
 Signal Company
 Radar Company
 Medical Company
 CBRN Protection Company

References 

Military units and formations of the 2022 Russian invasion of Ukraine
Military units and formations of Ukraine
Military of Ukraine